Stade Maurice David is a multi-purpose stadium in Aix-en-Provence, France that is mainly used for rugby union.  A new 1,000 capacity stand was built at the end of October 2018, bring the stadium capacity up to 6,000.  It is the home stadium of Provence Rugby, who play in Pro D2.

On 16 October 2020, the stadium hosted the final of the 2019–20 European Rugby Challenge Cup final after the match was moved from the Stade de Marseille due to the COVID-19 pandemic in Europe. Bristol Bears won the match over Toulon 32–19, in front of a limited crowd of 1,000 spectators.

References

Rugby union stadiums in France
Multi-purpose stadiums in France
Sports venues in Bouches-du-Rhône
Buildings and structures in Aix-en-Provence
Sports venues completed in 1975
1975 establishments in France